Chief Kitsap Academy (CKA) is a grade 6-12 school in Suquamish, in unincorporated Kitsap County, Washington, with a Poulsbo postal address. The  Suquamish Tribe Department of Education operates the school. The school is on a  parcel.

Prior to 2014 the school serving the Suquamish people was operated by the North Kitsap School District. In August 2014 the tribe signed a compact with the State of Washington to directly operate the school, with the state providing funding, the first instance of such in the state. In 2014 the school had 78 students and seven full-time teachers. The now-independent school previously occupied the ex-tribal center. It moved to its current campus, the former Northwest College of Art & Design, in 2018. The tribe had purchased the building for $5.03 million on November 28, 2017. The facility is the former Mains Manor.

Curriculum
The school teaches the culture of the Suquamish people and the Suquamish language, Lushootseed.

References

External links
 Chief Kitsap Academy

Public middle schools in Washington (state)
Public high schools in Washington (state)
Education in Kitsap County, Washington
2014 establishments in Washington (state)
Educational institutions established in 2014
Native American high schools
Native Americans in Washington (state)